Partick Thistle Football Club is a Scottish association football club based in the Maryhill area of Glasgow. The club first competed in a European competition in 1963–64, qualifying for the Inter-Cities Fairs Cup following a third-place finish in the Scottish First Division. The club reached the second round, which remains the club's joint best run in a European competition.

History

1963–64 Inter-Cities Fairs Cup
Partick Thistle's début in European football came in 1963–64 when they qualified for the Inter-Cities Fairs Cup after finishing third in the Scottish First Division behind Rangers and Kilmarnock respectively. Their first round opponents were Glentoran from Northern Ireland. Thistle won the away leg in Belfast 4–1. In the second leg at home they produced a 3–0 victory to progress to the next round comfortably 7–1 on aggregate. In the second round they faced Czechoslovakian club Spartak Brno. The first leg was played at home at Thistle won the tie 3–2. However, on the away leg Spartak Brno produced a convincing 4–0 victory to knock out Partick Thistle 6–3 on aggregate.

1972–73 UEFA Cup
Thistle qualified for the UEFA Cup for the first and only time in 1972–73 having defeated Celtic in the final of the Scottish League Cup the previous season. They faced Budapest Honvéd of Hungary in the first round. In the first leg of the tie Thistle lost 1–0 at Bozsik József Stadion in Budapest. In the return leg at Firhill they were also beaten, this time 3–0 to exit the tournament 4–0 on aggregate.

1995 UEFA Intertoto Cup

In 1995, Thistle competed in the UEFA Intertoto Cup. They were drawn in Group 6 along with Keflavík, LASK Linz, Metz and NK Zagreb. Each team played each other once, either home or away. Thistle's first match was against LASK Linz in Austria which ended in a 2–2 draw. Their next game was against Icelandic side Keflavík at home in Glasgow ending in a 3–1 victory. Thistle then faced French club Metz away from home which resulted in a narrow 1–0 defeat. Their final match was against NK Zagreb of Croatia at home narrowly losing 2–1. Thistle finished fourth overall in Group 6 which wasn't enough to qualify for the next round. Metz progressed to the knock-out stages after finishing top of the group with maximum points having won all their matches.

Overall record

By competition

By country

References

Partick Thistle F.C.
Partick Thistle